Pascal Forthuny (24 March 1872 - 29 April 1962) was a French art critic, clairvoyant medium and novelist.

Biography

Forthuny was born as Georges Léopold Cochet in Paris in 1872. He developed his alleged paranormal abilities of automatic writing, clairvoyance and psychometry in the 1920s after his son died in a plane crash. He was tested by psychical researchers such as Eugéne Osty and Charles Richet who were convinced he had genuine paranormal powers.

Other researchers were more skeptical. Samuel Soal wrote that Forthuny's work was "not always above suspicion." During an anonymous sitting in 1929, Forthuny had pretended to obtain his name by automatic writing but it was discovered that he previously attended lunch with psychical researchers Eleanor Sidgwick and V. J. Woolley who told him the afternoon sitter was Soal.

In 1930, an article in the French magazine Psychica accused Forthuny of fraud. During one of his alleged clairvoyant demonstrations he was said to have obtained signals from an accomplice who gave him information about his target.

Chair tests

Forthuny was known for carrying out "empty chair" tests in parapsychology. This type of experiment was originally devised by Eugéne Osty at the Institut Métapsychique International and conducted with Forthuny in April 1926. Forthuny was shown a marked empty chair in the conference room. He then gave predictions to a stenographer about the unknown person who would occupy the chair such as their appearance or characteristics. Later during the same day the room would be filled with people and the marked chair would be occupied. According to Osty the experiments were a success and evidence for precognition.  Criticism of the chair tests came from Antônio da Silva Mello who found the results suspicious as they were never replicated. The controls of the tests were also criticized and they are now considered discredited.

Publications

Notes et impressions de voyage: En Suisse (ill. P. Forthuny), Paris, La Semaine des constructeurs, 1898
Le Roi régicide: Roman social, Paris, Tallandier, 1898
La voie idéale: Les étapes inquiètes, Paris, Fasquelle, 1899
Une crise, Paris, Paul Ollendorf, 1901
L'Altesse, Paris, Tallandier, 1904
Amours d'Allemagne: Frieda, Paris, Pierre Douville, 1907
Les vierges solitaires: Roman social, Pierre Douville, 1909
Isabel ou le poignard d'argent: La tragédie des deux Espagne, Paris, Sansot & Cie, 1911
Au seuil de l’âme chinoise !: Essai pour une psychologie de l'apprenti sinologue, Paris, P. Dupont, 1915
Le vendeur d'huile et la reine de beauté : Maisons closes chinoise, Paris, Albin Michel, 1918
Le miracle des pruniers en fleurs: Roman chinois, Paris, Albin Michel, 1920
Une victoire de la photographie psychique: la romanesque et glorieuse aventure du medium William Hope (de Crew, Angleterre) accusé d'être un imposteur, traîné une année dans la boue, victime d'une sombre machination, enfin reconnu parfaitement innocent et incontestable medium photographe, Terrier frères et Cie, 1923
Les amants chinois, Paris, Albin Michel, 1924
Entretiens avec une outre : Devant la mort de Sarda Nafale et l'entrée des Croisés à Constantinople, Paris, G. Daugon imp, 1929
Je lis dans les destinées : La clairvoyance et ses médiums, Les éditions de France, 1937

References

Further reading

Anonymous. (1930). Psychica, January 1930. Journal of the Society for Psychical Research 26: 87. (Describes an allegation of fraud against Forthuny)
Eugéne Osty. (1926). Pascal Forthuny: Une faculté de connaissance supranormale. Félix Alcan.
Theodore Besterman. (1929). Pascal Forthuny: Paris. In Report of a Four Months' Tour of Psychical Investigation. Proceedings of the Society for Psychical Research 38: 474-476.

1872 births
1962 deaths
Clairvoyants
French art critics
French novelists
French spiritual mediums